Sofia Jozeffi (born София Львовна Липкина) was a Soviet film actress.

Selected filmography 
 1923 — Red Devils
 1923 — Legenda o Devichyey Bashne

References

External links 
 София Жозеффи on kino-teatr.ru

Soviet film actresses
1906 births
1997 deaths
Place of birth missing